The Siberian Ice Maiden, also known as the Princess of Ukok, the Altai Princess, Devochka and Ochy-bala (the heroine of the Altaic epic), is a mummy of a woman from the 5th century BC, found in 1993 in a kurgan of the Pazyryk culture in Republic of Altai, Russia. It was among the most significant Russian archaeological findings of the late 20th century. In 2012 she was moved to a special mausoleum at the Republican National Museum in Gorno-Altaisk.

Introduction 
The mummified remains of the Ice Maiden, a Scytho-Siberian woman who lived on the Eurasian Steppes in the 5th century BC, were found undisturbed in a subterranean burial chamber. Natalia Polosmak and her team discovered the Ice Maiden during the summer of 1993, when she was a senior research fellow at the Russian Institute of Archaeology and Ethnography in Novosibirsk. It was Polosmak's fourth season working on the Ukok Plateau where the institute was continuing its research into the early habitation of southern Siberia. Nearly two decades later, there are few English language sources available for the important discovery: Polosmak's National Geographic article from October 1994, and a BBC documentary (1997) featuring Polosmak and members of her team are the most informative and accessible.

The Ice Maiden was a representative of the Pazyryk culture that thrived between the 6th and 2nd centuries BC in the Siberian steppe.

The Ice Maiden's tomb was found on the Ukok Plateau near the border of China, in what is now the Autonomous Republic of Altai. The plateau, part of the Eurasian Steppes, is characterized by a harsh, arid climate. The area is known by the local people as the "second layer of heaven," one step above ordinary people and events. Present day Altai herdsmen still bring their sheep and horses to the plateau during winter because the fierce wind blows the snow off the grass and provides grazing land for the animals despite the freezing temperatures.

Discovery and excavation 

Polosmak and her team were guided by a border guard, Lt. Mikhail Chepanov, to a group of kurgans located in a strip of territory disputed between Russia and China. A kurgan is a burial mound filled in with smaller sediment and covered with a pile of rocks; typically, the mound covered a tomb chamber, which contained a burial inside a log coffin, with accompanying grave goods. Such burial chambers were built from notched wood logs to form a small cabin, which may have resembled the semi-nomads’ winter shelters. The Ice Maiden's tomb chamber was constructed in this way, and the wood and other organic materials present have allowed her burial to be dated. A core sample from the logs of her chamber was analyzed by a dendrochronologist, and samples of organic matter from the horses’ stomachs were examined as well, indicating that the Ice Maiden was buried in the spring, at some point during the 5th century BC.

Before Polosmak and her crew reached the Ice Maiden's chamber, they hit upon a second later burial in the same kurgan positioned on top of the Maiden's wooden tomb chamber. The contents included a stone and wood coffin containing a skeleton, along with three horses. Polosmak believes that this secondary burial was that of an outside group, perhaps of subordinate peoples, who considered it honorable to bury their dead in Pazyryk kurgans. A shaft dug into the kurgan indicated that this later grave had been robbed, another means by which water and snow entered and seeped into the Ice Maiden's hollow burial chamber. The water collected, froze, and formed an ice block within the chamber which never fully thawed because of the steppe climate, permafrost, and the rocks piled on top of the mound which deflected the sun's rays. The contents of the burial remained frozen for 2400 years, until the time of Polosmak's excavation.

Tomb chamber 
Inside the Maiden's tomb chamber was her coffin, which was made of a solid larch wood tree trunk decorated with leather appliqués depicting deer figures. The chamber also contained two small wood tables with tray-shaped tops, which were used to serve food and drink. Horsemeat and mutton had been placed on the tables; the residue of a dairy product, perhaps yogurt, was found in a wooden vessel with a carved handle and stirrer; and some kind of beverage was served in a horn cup to sustain her on her journey.

The Ice Maiden and her horses were oriented with their heads toward the east, as was the case in other Pazyryk burials. She was between 20 and 30 years old at the time of her death. The cause of the Ice Maiden's death was unknown until 2014, when new research suggested breast cancer, combined with injuries sustained in a fall, as likely culprits. The finding of cannabis in a container near the body led to the supposition that the drug was used to relieve the chronic pain that the woman would have suffered. She may have had the elevated status of a priestess in her community based upon the items found in her chamber. The Ice Maiden's preserved skin has the mark of an animal-style deer tattoo on one of her shoulders, and another on her wrist and thumb. She was buried in a yellow silk tussah blouse, a crimson-and-white striped wool skirt with a tassel belt, thigh-high white felt leggings, with a marten fur, a small mirror made from polished metal and wood with carved deer figures, and a headdress that stood nearly three feet tall. The size of the headdress necessitated a coffin that was eight feet long. The headdress had a wooden substructure with a molded felt covering and eight carved feline figures covered in gold. There were remains of coriander seeds in a stone dish that may have been provided for the Maiden's medicinal use.

Controversy 
The excavation of the Ice Maiden was carried out with great care, although in some ways it has been seen as problematic, due to the methods used to melt the ice and remove the artifacts and body from the coffin. The mummy also suffered deterioration during her transport from the site to the lab (even when she was in a refrigerated space) which resulted in her tattoos fading. Upon discovery of the tomb, the ice mummy was reported to have opium on her.

A dispute developed between the Russian authorities and the local inhabitants regarding the Ice Maiden, as local intelligentsia mythologised her as the nomadic progenitor of the Altaian people. Within the context of broader efforts by the Russian Federation's government to undermine regional political agency and, as a result, the cultural sovereignty of the Altai, the Ice Maiden became a focal symbol of Altaian identity. A local journalist described the issue:
  
For 19 years after her discovery, she was kept mainly at a scientific institute in Novosibirsk, but in September 2012, the mummy was returned to the Altai, where she is kept in a special mausoleum at the Republican National Museum in the capital Gorno-Altaysk. Future excavations of the site and the entire area have since been forbidden on the request of the local Altaian population, even though it is suspected more artifacts are inside the tomb and there are many more burial mounds in the area. An archeologist involved in the excavation has expressed fears that the bodies in the mounds, if left unexcavated, will decay because of climate change.

DNA research by the Russian Academy of Sciences found clear differences in the Ice Maiden's genetic material and that of modern Altaian communities, which led archaeologists to claim that the mummy was European and that Altaians were recent migrants to the region. This was used as a reason to keep the mummy in Novosibirsk, and in 2004 the archaeologists who had refused to repatriate the Ice Maiden to the Altai because of her supposed European heritage were awarded the prestigious State Prize of the Russian Federation. Claims regarding the Ice Maiden's European or Altaian descent are, however, considered the products of indigenous Altaian cultural identity and political autonomy being undermined by a broad "Russian" nationalism.

In popular culture 

 Ledi, a 2018 book-length poem by the Canadian poet Kim Trainor, narrates the controversial excavation of the Ice Maiden.

See also 
 Anokhin Museum in Gorno-Altaysk
 Altai Republic
 Dendrochronology
 Eurasian Steppes
 Kurgan
 Mummy
 Natalia Polosmak
 Pazyryk burials
 Scythians
 Ukok Plateau

References 

1993 archaeological discoveries
Archaeology of Russia
Archaeology of Siberia
Discovered cryopreserved organisms
Mummies
Saka people
5th-century BC women